Jeon Yeo-been (born Jeon Bo-young on July 26, 1989) is a South Korean actress. Jeon rose to prominence for her performance in the independent film After My Death (2018) which earned her the Actress of the Year Award at the 22nd Busan International Film Festival and the Independent Star Award at the 2017 Seoul Independent Film Festival. Jeon's career continues to rise after she starred in the television series Vincenzo (2021) and the crime action film Night in Paradise (2021).

Career
Jeon learned acting when she studied Broadcast Entertainment at Dongduk Women's University. She started acting 5 years later after actress and director Moon So-ri saw her in a trailer for the Seoul International Women's Film Festival and contacted her to make an appearance in the short film The Best Director.

In 2015, Jeon made her debut in the period drama film The Treacherous. In 2017, Jeon portrayed an undercover journalist investigating a religious cult in the thriller TV series Save Me. Jeon rose to prominence after her performance in After My Death (2018), and received numerous accolades, including Best New Actress at the 56th Grand Bell Awards, the Actress of the Year Award at the 22nd Busan International Film Festival, and the Independent Star Award at the 2017 Seoul Independent Film Festival.

On July 2, 2018, it was announced that Jeon has signed with J.Wide-Company.

In September 2020, Jeon starred in the crime action film Night in Paradise. In February 2021, she starred in tvN television series Vincenzo alongside Song Joong-ki. On March 15, 2021, Jeon was cast in Netflix upcoming series Glitch. She is set to portray a woman who is looking for her missing boyfriend. On July 12, 2021, she signed with Management MMM after her contract with J.Wide Company expired.

Filmography

Film

Television series

Web series

Hosting

Awards and nominations

Notes

References

External links 
 
 

1989 births
Living people
South Korean film actresses
South Korean television actresses
Dongduk Women's University alumni
People from Gangneung